Orlando Luz and Rafael Matos were the defending champions but chose not to defend their title.

Dustin Brown and Andrea Vavassori won the title after defeating Ivan and Matej Sabanov 6–4, 7–5 in the final.

Seeds

Draw

References

External links
 Main draw

Internazionali di Tennis del Friuli Venezia Giulia - Men's doubles
2022 Men's doubles